Harold Edward "Hal" Porter  (16 February 1911 – 29 September 1984) was an Australian novelist, playwright, poet and short story writer.

Biography
Porter was born in Albert Park, Victoria, grew up in Bairnsdale, and worked as a journalist, teacher and librarian. A car accident just before the outbreak of World War II prevented him from serving in the armed forces. His first stories were published in 1942 and by the 1960s he was writing full-time. His 1963 memoir, The Watcher on the Cast Iron Balcony, is regarded as an Australian masterpiece.

His other works were less successful. The literary critic Laurie Clancy said: "Porter's novels are, with one exception, less successful than his stories, not least because his scorn for most of his characters becomes wearying over the length of a novel." The exception, Clancy thought, was The Tilted Cross, a historical novel set in Hobart in the 1840s.

On 24 July 1983 he was knocked down by a hit-and-run driver in Ballarat and received brain damage. He died on 29 September 1984.

Honours
In the 1982 Queen's Birthday Honours Porter was made a Member of the Order of Australia (AM) for service to literature. The life and work of Porter has also been honoured since 2006 through the annual Hal Porter Short Story Competition, under the auspices of the East Gippsland Art Gallery, in Bairnsdale, Victoria, Australia.

Posthumous reputation
After Porter's death, his friend and biographer Mary Lord revealed in her book Hal Porter: Man of Many Parts that Porter had had sexual relations with Lord's then ten-year-old son; despite this, she chose to remain friends with him. Other critics, notably Noel Rowe, have argued that a close reading of his various works reveals a strong interest in paedophilia.

Bibliography 

Poetry
 The Hexagon (1956)
 Elijah's Ravens (1968)
 In an Australian Graveyard (1974)

Novels
 A Handful of Pennies (1958)
 The Tilted Cross (1961)
 The Right Thing (1971)

Short story collections
 A Bachelor's Children (1962)
 Short Stories (1942)
 The Cats of Venice (1965)
 The Actors: An image of the new Japan (1968)
 Mr. Butterfry and Other Tales of New Japan (1970)
 Selected Stories (1971)
 Fredo Fuss Love Life (1974)
 The Portable Hal Porter (1978)
 The Clairvoyant Goat (1981)

Memoirs
 The Watcher on the Cast-Iron Balcony (1963)
 The Paper Chase (1966)
 Criss-Cross (1973)
 The Extra (1975)

Local History
 Bairnsdale: Portrait of an Australian country town (1977)

Drama
 The Tower (1963)
 The Professor (1966)
 Eden House (1969)

External links 
 First Person - Hal Porter, Watcher from the Cast-Iron Balcony at Radio National
 Hill of Content Bookshop Hal Porter Short Story Competition
 "No one but I will know": Hal Porter’s Honesty by Noel Rowe
 Hal Porter Short Story Prize

References 
Craven, Peter. "Porter: friend and betrayer," The Australian, 15–16 January 1994, Review 3.

Mary Lord: Hal Porter: Man of Many Parts (Random House, Sydney, 1993)

Noel Rowe: '"No one but I will know": Hal Porter's Honesty', in Australian Humanities Review, Issue 41, February 2007

1911 births
1984 deaths
20th-century Australian novelists
20th-century Australian dramatists and playwrights
20th-century Australian poets
Australian male novelists
Australian memoirists
Australian male short story writers
People from Bairnsdale
Australian male poets
Australian male dramatists and playwrights
20th-century Australian short story writers
20th-century Australian male writers
Members of the Order of Australia
20th-century memoirists